Sugarbush Resort is a ski resort located in the Mad River valley in Warren, Vermont, owned by Alterra Mountain Company. It is one of the largest ski resorts in New England. The resort encompasses more than 4000 acres (16 km²) total, 484 trail acres (2.34 km²) skiable,  53 miles (85 km) of trails, and 16 ski lifts.

History 
Sugarbush was opened on December 25, 1958, by Damon and Sara Gadd and Jack Murphy.  In 1977, the Gadds sold the resort to Roy Cohen.  Cohen purchased the Glen Ellen Ski Area (Mount Ellen) in 1979 and annexed it to Sugarbush. ARA Services purchased the resort in 1983, replacing the original gondola with the Super Bravo and Heaven's Gate triple chair lifts, effectively increasing uphill capacity from 450 skiers per hour to 1800.

Claneil Enterprises bought the resort in 1984 and transformed it into a four-season resort, purchasing adjacent tennis courts, restaurants, condominiums, and a golf course. Claneil improved the chairlift system by installing three new lifts on Mount Ellen. The American Skiing Company purchased Sugarbush in 1995 and installed seven new lifts, increased snowmaking by 300%, and built a sixty-three million gallon reservoir for snowmaking. During this period, Mount Ellen and the main part of Sugarbush were connected by the Slide Brook Express two-way quad chairlift; when it was installed was the world's fastest chairlift, and is still the world's longest detachable chairlift.

When the American Skiing Company bought Sugarbush, the Original Green Mountain Express (GMX) chair at Mount Ellen was moved to replace the aging North Ridge Double.  Then the GMX was replaced with a new fixed grip quad from Doppelmayer that ran up to the base of Cliffs to encourage use of the new North Ridge Express and the Slide Brook Express. This lift became known as the "Slug" because it was slow and impractical. Current Sugarbush owner Summit Ventures replaced this chair with a Poma high speed quad which runs the full length of the original GMX (up to the Glen House), and "the Slug" is now Jay Peak's Metro Quad.  Also, the North Lynx Triple was formerly the Sugarbravo triple chair, and was moved to the North Lynx peak to replace a platter lift when the Super Bravo detachable quad was installed.  The Castlerock double was also replaced in 2001 with another double following the same chair spacing specs as the original lift.

Summit Ventures NE LLC purchased the resort in October 2001. The majority owner of Summit Ventures is Win Smith who also serves as President of Sugarbush Resort.  Adam Greshin is the second active investor and is the EVP of Sugarbush Resort.  Since 2001 Sugarbush has replaced and reconfigured some of the lifts, made further snowmaking improvements such as purchasing new low energy guns, and has completed the $80 million Lincoln Peak Village in 2010, which includes the Claybrook luxury condominium complex,  new base lodges (The Gatehouse and The Farmhouse), Rumble's Kitchen, a post-and-beam restaurant. and the Schoolhouse which houses both summer and winter children's programs.  The first phase of the Rice Brook slope side residences are scheduled for completion in October 2013.

According to resort president Win Smith, the resort had no plans to add any further high speed chairs.  The intent was, rather, is to keep lift capacity approximately the same to maintain the current uphill/downhill capacity relationship. Sugarbush is known for not feeling overcrowded even on the busiest days.

In 2008, Sugarbush purchased and refurbished a 12-person snowcat to be used for transport to Allyn's Lodge for dining as well as moonlight ski and snowshoe tours.  In 2008, Sugarbush celebrated its 50th Anniversary in December.

The 2013-2014 season marks Mt Ellen's 50th (and Sugarbush's 55th) anniversary. The Sunshine Double, installed in 1964, was the last remaining original lift. The base lodge also remains largely unchanged throughout Ellen's history.

In the 2015 offseason, Sugarbush installed a new fixed grip quad to replace the slow and aging Valley House double. For the 2017-2018 season, Sugarbush replaced its older beginner chairlifts, replacing the Village and Sunshine Double chairlifts with fixed-grip quads, similar to the Valley House Quad.

Alterra Mountain Company purchased Sugarbush in November 2019.

Skiing at Sugarbush 
Sugarbush has two mountain areas separated by Slide Brook Basin. The south side of Sugarbush, Lincoln Peak, is the resort's main mountain area. Most of the resort real estate is located at Lincoln Peak, including the new Claybrook condominiums and hotel. Also at Lincoln Peak are several other smaller peaks: Gadd Peak, Castlerock Peak, and North Lynx Peak.

Castlerock
Castlerock Peak is known to for its steep, narrow, winding, New England-style runs. A single double chair brings skiers and riders to this peak and is littered with warnings of "expert only" and "thin coverage." It is also the only peak of Sugarbush that does not use snowmaking, although there are several runs such as Paradise and Domino not in the Castlerock area that also do not incorporate snowmaking. Castlerock is also home to Rumble, arguably the most difficult trail at Sugarbush.

Slide Brook
The area between Lincoln Peak and Mt. Ellen is called the Slide Brook Basin.  This wooded wilderness area comprises over 1000 acres (4 km²) and is skiable only with a guided tour and is for expert skiers only. Some of this terrain is very treacherous, and it is not routinely swept by ski patrol. If you follow the Slide Brook it will bring you out to German Flats Road. When the shuttle bus is running it makes a stop at Slide Brook Road (on German Flats) and will drop off at either Lincoln or Ellen base areas. The two areas of Sugarbush, Lincoln Peak and Mt. Ellen are connected by a two mile long chairlift known as the Slide Brook Express Quad. The Quad mainly operates on weekends and holidays, but does occasionally during the week. It will also not run if the temperature is below five degrees or during strong winds.

Mt. Ellen
To the north, separate from Lincoln Peak, is Sugarbush's other mountain area called Mt. Ellen. Several states and southern Quebec are visible from the summit of Mt. Ellen.

Formerly an independent resort (founded by Walt Elliot in the early 1960s), Mt. Ellen has Sugarbush's steepest run, FIS. Mt. Ellen also has a secondary peak, Inverness Peak, which is home to the Green Mountain Valley School's (GMVS) racing slopes Inverness, and Brambles.

Mt. Ellen is also home to Sugarbush's terrain park.  Although some terrain features can be found all over Sugarbush, such as on Slowpoke at Lincoln Peak,  the primary terrain parks on Mt. Ellen's Riemergasse and Sugar Run trails.  Sugarbush has chosen not to build a half pipe in recent years, though it has the capability to do so.

Mt. Ellen's terrain includes groomers, terrain parks, and tree skiing, along with mogul terrain.

Snow at Sugarbush 

Sugarbush has approximately 70% snowmaking coverage, with some areas intentionally devoid of snowmaking systems.

Mountain statistics

The Mountains 
 Mount Ellen: 
 Lincoln Peak: 
 Castlerock Peak: 
 North Lynx Peak: 
 Gadd Peak: 
 Inverness Peak:

Statistics 
  total
  skiable
  of trails
 11 wooded areas
   summit elevation
   base elevation
   vertical drop
  annual snowfall
 68% snowmaking coverage

Terrain

Lifts
 In total, there are 16 chairlifts at Sugarbush. There are 7 on Lincoln Peak, and 8 on Mt.Ellen.

Lincoln Peak

Mt.Ellen

Off-season at Sugarbush 
Sugarbush has a health and recreation center, known as the SHARC (pronounced "shark"), with three indoor tennis courts, four outdoor clay courts, two outdoor hard courts, one racquetball court, two squash courts, a weight room, indoor and outdoor pools and hottubs, steam rooms, massage rooms, a rock gym, and a dance/exercise floor.

Sugarbush also has an 18-hole par 71 Robert Trent Jones Sr. golf course, known for its mountainous topography.

Sugarbush is also available for hiking and biking, with mountain terrain for a variety of ability levels. The Bravo lift runs seven days a week from late June through labor day weekend, then on weekends through Columbus Day for lift-accessed Mountain Biking and Disc Golf. Also available in the Summer is an  zip line.

On rare occasions, Sugarbush has hosted "Summerstage" concerts in the offseason. The Vermont band Phish performed at the resort on July 16, 1994, and the complete concert was released on the album Live Phish Volume 2 in 2001. The band performed two more concerts at the venue in July 1995.

Sugarbush has two top-rated disc golf courses. The mountain course requires a chairlift ride and is rated by the Professional Disc Golf Association as the third most difficult in the country. Recently Sugarbush hosted the National Deaf Disc Golf Championship and the New England Championship.

In the Fall, Lincoln Peak offers foliage lift rides on Fridays and weekends through Columbus Day.

The Long Trail, a  hiking trail running the length of Vermont, traverses the summits of both Lincoln Peak and Mount Ellen.

References

External links 

 
 

Ski areas and resorts in Vermont
Warren, Vermont
Resorts in the United States
Buildings and structures in Warren, Vermont
Tourist attractions in Washington County, Vermont